South Shillong is one of the 60 Legislative Assembly constituencies of Meghalaya state in India. It is part of East Khasi Hills district. It falls under Shillong Lok Sabha constituency and its current MLA is Sanbor Shullai of Bharatiya Janata Party.

Member of Legislative Assembly
The list of MLAs are given below

|-style="background:#E9E9E9;"
!Year
!colspan="2" align="center"|Party
!align="center" |MLA
!Votes
|-
|2013
|bgcolor="#00B2B2"|
|align="left"| Nationalist Congress Party
|align="left"| Sanbor Shullai
|7179
|-
|2018
|bgcolor="#FF9933"|
|align="left"| Bharatiya Janata Party
|align="left"| Sanbor Shullai
|11204
|}

Election results

2018

See also
Shillong (Lok Sabha constituency)
East Khasi Hills district

References

Assembly constituencies of Meghalaya
East Khasi Hills district